Joseph Schlossel (21 December 1902 - 1 December 1977)  was a science fiction writer, a pioneer of the space opera genre. E. F. Bleiler in his bibliographic work Science-Fiction: The Early Years describes Schlossel's work as "crude and amateurish", but notes that it anticipated further developments.<ref>"Science-fiction, the early years by Everett Franklin Bleiler, section "Schlosser, J."</ref> Despite his poor storytelling skills, he was credited by showing "tremendous inventiveness in his adventures, with intergalactic wars and invasions on an immense scale." Mike Ashley states that "Schlossel's writing was basic but his imagination and vision made him one of the more significant contributors to the early SF Magazines".

Schlossel was born in New York in 1902. He was raised in Toronto and became a tailor, his father's line of work. His first story was published in Weird Tales in 1925, where his next two stories appeared. Beginning in 1926, his remaining work was sold to Amazing Stories''. After the Great Depression set in, he left his trade, took employment in metal plating, and stopped writing. He died in 1977.

His work usually carried the byline "J. Schlossel". None of his stories have appeared in book form, although two were reprinted in later sf magazines.

Short fiction
Invaders from Outside (1925)
Hurled into the Infinite (1925)
A Message From Space (1926)
The Second Swarm (1928)
To The Moon by Proxy (1928)
Extra-Galactic Invaders (1931)

References

American science fiction writers
American short story writers
American male novelists
American male short story writers